Swathi may refer to:

Film
 Swathi (1985 film)
 Swathi (1994 film), a 1994 Indian Kannada romantic drama film directed by Shivamani
 Swathi Chinukulu, a 1989 Telugu-language Indian feature film directed by Sri Chakravarthy
 Swathi Kiranam, a 1992 Telugu musical film
 Swathi Muthu, a 2003 Indian Kannada film which was directed by D. Rajendra Babu
 Swathi Muthyam, a 1985 Telugu film

People
 Swathi (actress), Tamil film actress in the 1990s
 Swathi Deekshith, Indian actress in Telugu, Bengali and Tamil films
 Swati Reddy, Telugu and Tamil film actress
 Swathi Thirunal Rama Varma (1813–1846), maharaja of the state of Travancore, India
 Swati Verma, Indian film actress

Other
 Swathi (magazine), a Telugu weekly women's magazine
 Swathi, Nepal
 Swathi Sangeetha Puraskaram, an honour for musicians
 Swathi Sangeethotsavam, a music festival celebrating the compositions of Maharaja Swathi Thirunal
 Swathi Thirunal College of Music, in Thiruvananthapuram, Kerala, India

See also
 Swati (disambiguation)

Hindu given names
Sanskrit-language names
Indian feminine given names
Indian given names
Telugu names